Relative Merits is a 1987 mini series about three months in the life of a radio journalist.

References

External links

1980s Australian television miniseries
1987 Australian television series debuts
1987 Australian television series endings
1987 television films
1987 films